The 1986 Commonwealth Games were held in Edinburgh, Scotland, between 24 July and 2 August 1986. They were the second Games to be held in Edinburgh. Thirty two of the eligible fifty nine countries (largely African, Asian and Caribbean states) boycotted the event because of the Thatcher government's policy of keeping Britain's sporting links with apartheid South Africa.

Organisation 
Unlike the 1970 Games in Edinburgh, which were popular and successful, the 1986 Games are ill-famed for the wide political boycott connected with them and the resulting financial mismanagement.

Controversies 
In addition to the boycott, further controversy arose when it was revealed that through this much-reduced participation and the resultant decline in anticipated broadcasting and sponsorship revenues, the Organising Committee was facing a big financial black hole. The boycott ended any prospect of securing emergency government assistance. Businessman Robert Maxwell stepped in to offer funding, taking over as chairman; but although he promised to invest £2m, his contribution was just £250,000. On a budget of £14m, the Games opened with a deficit of £3m, which later grew to £4.3m, and instead of putting enough money into the event to save it, the new chairman of the Games asked creditors to forgo half the payment due to them to keep the event out of liquidation. The debt was finally paid off in 1989, with the city of Edinburgh losing approximately £500,000.

Several athletes were excluded because they breached the amateurism rules, most notably lawn bowlers Phil Skoglund from New Zealand and Willie Wood from Scotland, both of whom have competed in subsequent Games.

Participating teams
Due to the boycott only 27 teams from across the Commonwealth were represented at the 1986 Games.

Boycott

Thirty two of the eligible fifty nine countries (largely African, Asian and Caribbean states) boycotted the event because of the Thatcher government's policy of keeping Britain's sporting links with apartheid South Africa in preference to participating in the general sporting boycott of that country. Consequently, Edinburgh 1986 witnessed the lowest turnout since Auckland 1950. Bermuda was a particularly late withdrawal, as its athletes had appeared in the opening ceremony and in the opening day of competition before the Bermuda Olympic Association decided to formally withdraw.

Opening ceremony
The theme of the opening ceremony celebrated the "Spirit of Youth" and included 6500 Scottish schoolchildren taking part in a series of large Mass Games-style Gymnastics routines. The theme song "Spirit of Youth" was written by Gerard Kenny. The ceremony began on the esplanade of Edinburgh Castle from which hundreds of schoolchildren ran down the Royal Mile, through Holyrood Park to Meadowbank Stadium.

Venues
 Meadowbank Stadium
 Royal Commonwealth Pool
 Strathclyde Park
 Barry Buddon
 Balgreen, Bowls

Medals by country

Medals by event

Aquatics

Athletics

Badminton

Bowls

Boxing

Cycling

Track

Road

Judo (demonstration sport)

Rowing

Shooting

Pistol

Rifle

Shotgun

Weightlifting

Wrestling

See also
 1970 Commonwealth Games, held in Edinburgh
 2014 Commonwealth Games, held in Glasgow.

References

External links
 Commonwealth Games Official Site
 1986 Commonwealth Games – Australian Commonwealth Games Association official website
 Video of the Opening Ceremony

 
Commonwealth Games by year
Commonwealth Games
Commonwealth Games
Commonwealth Games in the United Kingdom
1980s in Edinburgh
International sports competitions in Edinburgh
International sports boycotts
Commonwealth Games
Commonwealth Games